Panchuara (also known as Pachhwara) is a village in Amrapara CD block in Pakur subdivision of Pakur district in the Indian state of Jharkhand.

Geography

Location

Overview
Rajmahal coalfield is shown in the map. The entire area is overwhelmingly rural with only small pockets of urbanisation.

Note: The full screen map is interesting. All places marked on the map are linked and you can easily move on to another page of your choice. Enlarge the map to see what else is there – one gets railway links, many more road links and so on.

Demographics
According to the 2011 Census of India, Panchuara had a total population of 2,958, of which 1,486 (50%) were males and 1,472 (50%) were females. Population in the age range 0–6 years was 609. The total number of literate persons in Panchuara was 2,349 (50.62% of the population over 6 years).

Economy
Panem Coal, a joint venture of Punjab State Power Corporation and Eastern Minerals and Trading Agency (EMTA), operates the Pachhwara Central project. It is estimated that Pachhwara Central block has reserves of 562 million tonnes of coal. It is a part of the Rajmahal coalfield. An open cast mine has been developed across  . It supplies coal to three power pants in Punjab. Jharkhand state government earns a royalty of around Rs. 100 crores annually. The operations have displaced 250 families. The project began in 2002 and ran into trouble when the Santhal community inhabiting the area were pushed off their land. Sister Valsa John, an Indian nun, organised the Santhals to demand compensation for their land for the project. Ultimately Panem Coal was forced into a compensation agreement. However, Sister Valsa was beaten and hacked to death by a mob in 2011.

References

Villages in Pakur district
Mining communities in Jharkhand